Jean Louis George Émilien Dumas (November 4, 1804 – September 21, 1873) was a French scholar, paleontologist, and geologist.

Biography 

Born to a Protestant family of the bourgeoisie in Gard, Émilien Dumas was immersed from his early childhood in an atmosphere of learning and erudition.  His father, a former merchant involved in agriculture, was an educated man.  The native flora of Gard provided him with his first field of study. From 1815 to 1824, he studied at Morges, Switzerland, then at Basel, where his passion for the natural sciences matured. He returned to his homeland in 1824 following the death of his mother.

Embarking on a career in the sciences, he went to Paris and studied at the Collège de France, the Ecole des Mines de Paris and the Muséum national d'histoire naturelle, and with Georges Cuvier,  Étienne Geoffroy Saint-Hilaire, and Adrien-Henri de Jussieu.

His education in the natural sciences was well rounded, and he threw himself with equal passion into Zoology, Mineralogy, and Botany, as well as engaging in the contemporary debate over Lamarckism.

In 1828, he returned to Sommières, where he married Pauline Borel, a wealthy heiress from Orange, and daughter of a silk manufacturer. The same year, he unveiled a rich paleontological dig site at Pondres (Gard) whose human and animal remains fueled Lamarckist arguments, particularly in the field of Archaeozoology

He surveyed his region with great patience and tenacity over a period of 20 years, to produce a geological map of the département of Gard. During a long voyage in the 1860s he studied the geography of southern Europe. As an avid collector, he cultivated his curiosity throughout his life, and the Natural History Museum at Nîmes now preserves a large part of his numerous collections spanning the fields of Greek antiquities, botany, and geology.

The missing piece in this portrait of the "Explorer of Gard" is his taste for theater and acting. He was a willing participant as well as observer, which was considered by his contemporaries as incompatible with his role as a scientist.

He died on September 21, 1873 in Ax-sur-Ariège.

Works 
 Émilien Dumas, 1876

Bibliography 
 Édouard Dumas, Émilien Dumas et l'empreinte de Sommières, Lacour-Ollé, 1993.
 « Émilien Dumas, l'explorateur du Gard », Catalogue de l'expostion organisée à l'occasion du bicentenaiee de sa naissance, Musée d'Histoire naturelle de Nîmes.

External links
 An article by the Sommières Association (French)
 The text of his treatise on the geology of Gard (French)

1804 births
1873 deaths
French geologists
French paleontologists
Lamarckism